Definite Maybe may refer to:

 "Definite Maybe", a 2009 song by Jonathan Fagerlund from Welcome to My World
 "Definite Maybe", a 1983 song by the Kinks from State of Confusion
 "A Definite Maybe", a 2005 song by Dean Tuftin
 "A Definite Maybe", a 2013 song by Indica
 The Definite Maybe, a 1997 film starring Josh Lucas

See also
Definitely Maybe (disambiguation)